Great Cressingham is a Norfolk village which lies about  of Watton,  south of Swaffham and only  off the A1065 arterial road just north of Hilborough.

The village's name origin is uncertain but probably means 'Homestead/village of Cressa's people', or perhaps, 'cress homestead/village'.

The village church is dedicated to Saint Michael. in the Benefice of Cockley Cley.

There is a pub called the Olde Windmill Inn.

The village school was built in 1840. It was used as a local Authority school until 1992 and was then acquired by Tom and Sally North. They have restored it as closely as possible to how it would have been in Victorian times and now run free historical school days.

Great Cressingham is on the very edge of the British Army's Stanford Training Area.

References

http://kepn.nottingham.ac.uk/map/place/Norfolk/Great%20and%20Little%20Cressingham

Villages in Norfolk
Breckland District
Civil parishes in Norfolk